QC may refer to:

 Queen's Counsel, the title of a King's Counsel, a type of lawyer in Commonwealth countries, during the reign of a queen
 Quality control, the process of meeting products and services to consumer expectations

Places
 Quebec, a Canadian province
 Quebec City, capital of the Province of Quebec, Canada
 Quezon City, Philippines
 The Quad Cities, a polycentric metropolitan area on the Mississippi River in the United States
 Queen City (disambiguation), several populated places
 The QC, a nickname for Charlotte, North Carolina

Arts, entertainment, and media
 Quake Champions, a first-person shooter video game
 Quality Control Music, an Atlanta-based record label
 Questionable Content, a web-comic by Jeph Jacques

Education
 QualiEd College, a school in Hong Kong
 Queen's College (disambiguation), several institutions

Science and technology

Computing
 QuakeC, a scripting language in the computer game Quake by ID Software
 Quantum computing, a type of computation
 Quantum cryptography, a variety of cryptography employing quantum mechanics or quantum computers
 Quartz Composer, a node-based visual programming language
 Quick Charge, a technology for managing power delivered over USB

Other uses in science and technology
 ATCvet code QC, a section of the Anatomical Therapeutic Chemical Classification System for veterinary medicinal products
 Quantum cascade, a technique used in a quantum cascade laser
 Quantum chemistry, quantum mechanical methods in chemistry

Other uses
 Quebec Central Railway, a former railway in Canada
 QuietComfort, a product line of Bose headphones
 Quota Count system, a limit on night-time aircraft noise